Lieutenant Colonel Henning Bertil Stjernfelt (24 July 1917 – 21 January 2017) was a Swedish Army officer and military historian. He wrote several books about World War II and the Swedish coastal defence. Stjernfelt was also a part of the formation of the Swedish Coastal Rangers in 1956.

Early life
Stjernfelt was born on 24 July 1917 in Gustavi Parish, Gothenburg and Bohus County, Sweden, the son of Henning Stjernfelt, a dentist, and his wife Ruth (née Magnusson). He passed studentexamen at Norra Latin in Stockholm in 1937.

Career

Military career
Stjernfelt graduated from the Royal Swedish Naval Academy in 1940 and was commissioned as an officer and assigned to Vaxholm Coastal Artillery Regiment on 9 April, earlier then planned due to the German attack on Denmark and Norway. On the same day, he had to mobilize a preparedness unit in the inlet towards Stockholm. Already as a young lieutenant, he became battery commander of an artillery battery on the island of Roten in the northern Sea of Åland, a battery that kept full combat readiness throughout the World War II. At an early age he developed a great interest in military history. Shortly after the end of World War II, he cycled with his new wife Borghild along the invasion coast of Normandy, gathering information both in the terrain and from the German commanders who led the defence there. This resulted in the book Alarm i Atlantvallen ("Alarm in the Atlantic Wall"). A French edition of this book prompted an appreciative letter from general Charles de Gaulle.

Stjernfelt attended the Royal Swedish Naval Staff College's Staff and Artillery Course from 1947 to 1949 and the Royal Marines Amphibious Warfare Course in England in 1951. Stjernfelt then served as a teacher at the Royal Swedish Naval Academy and the Royal Swedish Naval Staff College from 1951 to 1955. Stjernfelt became an avid debater for the coastal artillery defence to be supplemented with amphibious units, among other things through the book Swedish amphibious units - luxury or necessity. This resulted in 1956 in the establishment of the Coastal Rangers. Stjernfelt served as commander of the Coastal Artillery Warrant Officers' School (Kustartilleriets befälsskola) in Gothenburg from 1956 to 1958 and he was promoted to major in 1957 and was assigned as a regimental officer in the Coastal Artillery Staff (Kustartilleristaben) in Gothenburg from 1958 to 1962. He served as chief of staff in Gotland Coastal Artillery Defence with Gotland Coastal Artillery Corps from 1962 to 1964 and was promoted to lieutenant colonel and attended the Swedish National Defence College in 1963. Stjernfelt was then head of the Naval Staff's Intelligence Department from 1964 to 1970, during which time he was an expert in the Swedish Armed Forces' Total Defence Security Investigation (1965–1969) and served as commander and colonel of the Swedish UN contingent, part of the United Nations Peacekeeping Force in Cyprus (UNFICYP), in Cyprus (1966–1967). In 1968, Stjernfelt attended the Senior Foreign Officers Intelligence Course in United States and he was then head of the military history department at the Swedish Armed Forces Staff College and a member of the military history delegation from 1970 until his retirement in 1977.

Post-retirement
After retirement, Stjernfelt received a Bachelor of Arts degree in 1979 and from 1982 he conducted research at the UN Department and in the Royal Swedish Society of Naval Sciences and more. He was also a member of Täby culture board and municipal council from 1979 to 1982. Stjernfelt was a diligent writer on military historical events, including the publications Alarm i Atlantvallen and Vägen till Westerplatte, publications translated into German and French. He also appeared in several articles in Tidskrift i Sjöväsendet and in Royal Swedish Academy of War Sciences's Handlingar och Tidskrift.

Personal life
In 1947, Stjernfelt married Borghild Maria Kihlstedt (1923–2003), the daughter of major Hugo Kihlstedt and Vera (née Blomquist). He was the father of Marie-Christine, Hélène and Cecilia.

Death
Stjernfelt died on 21 January 2017 in Stockholm. He was interred on 24 July 2017 at Djursholm cemetery.

Dates of rank
1940 – Second lieutenant
19?? – Lieutenant
19?? – Captain
1957 – Major
1963 – Lieutenant colonel

Awards and decorations
  Coastal Ranger Association Medal of Merit (Förbundet Kustjägarnas förtjänstmedalj) in silver (2004)

Honours
Member of the Royal Swedish Society of Naval Sciences (1970)
Member of the Royal Swedish Academy of War Sciences, Department II (1977)

Bibliography

References

1917 births
2017 deaths
Swedish Coastal Artillery officers
Members of the Royal Swedish Society of Naval Sciences
Members of the Royal Swedish Academy of War Sciences
Military personnel from Gothenburg
Swedish military historians